USS Najelda (SP-277) was a wooden motor boat, was built in 1907 by N. Emanuel, Brunswick, Georgia, for Capt. F. P. Barry, of New Orleans, Louisiana. She was acquired by the United States Navy on 1 May 1917, and commissioned on 6 May 1917.

After patrol duty along the Gulf Coast, she was decommissioned on 9 December 1918, struck from the Naval Vessel Register on 11 June 1919, and sold to A. Denapolis, New Orleans, on 30 October 1919.

References

External links
Photo gallery at Navsource.org

Motorboats of the United States Navy
Patrol vessels of the United States Navy
World War I patrol vessels of the United States
Ships built in Brunswick, Georgia
1907 ships